Laogai, short for laodong gaizao, which means reform through labor, is a criminal justice system involving the use of penal labor and prison farms in the People's Republic of China (PRC). Láogǎi is different from láojiào, or re-education through labor, which was the abolished administrative detention system for people who were not criminals but had committed minor offenses, and was intended to "reform offenders into law-abiding citizens".  Persons who were detained in the laojiao were detained in facilities that were separate from those which comprised the general prison system of the laogai. Both systems, however, were based on penal labor.

In 1994 the laogai camps were renamed "prisons". However, Chinese criminal law still stipulates that prisoners able to work shall "accept education and reform through labor". The existence of an extensive network of forced-labor camps producing consumer goods for export to Europe and the United States became classified. Publication of information about China's prison system by Al Jazeera English resulted in its expulsion from China on May 7, 2012.

The system has been estimated to have caused tens of millions of deaths and it has also been likened to slavery.

History
During the 1950s and 1960s, Chinese prisons, which were similar to organized factories, contained large numbers of people who were considered too critical of the government or "counter-revolutionaries". However, many people arrested for political or religious reasons were released in the late 1970s at the start of the Deng Xiaoping reforms (known as reform and opening).

In the 21st century, critics have said that Chinese prisons produce products for sale in foreign countries, with the profits going to the PRC government.  Products include everything from green tea to industrial engines to coal dug from mines.  According to James D. Seymour and Richard Anderson, who both teach at Chinese schools, the products made in laogai camps comprise an insignificant amount of mainland China's export output and gross domestic product. They argue that the use of prison labor for manufacturing is not in itself a violation of human rights, and that most prisoners in Chinese prisons are serving time for what are generally regarded as crimes in the West. The West's criticism of the laogai is based not only on the export of products made by forced labor, but also on the claims of detainees being held for political or religious violations, such as leadership of unregistered Chinese House Churches.  While the laogai has attracted widespread criticism for the poor conditions in the prisons, Seymour and Anderson claim that reports are exaggerated, stating that "even at its worst, the laogai is not, as some have claimed, "the Chinese equivalent of the Soviet gulag".

Structural changes following the introduction of market reforms have reduced tax revenue to local governments, increasing pressure for local governments to supplement their income from elsewhere. At the same time, prisoners usually do not make a good workforce. The products manufactured by prison labor in China are of  low quality and have become unsalable on the open market in competition with products made by non-imprisoned paid labor.

Harry Wu has written books, including Troublemaker and Laogai, that describe the system from the 19(?)0s to the 1990s. Wu spent 19 years, from 1960 to 1979, as a prisoner in these camps, for having criticized the government while he was a young college student. After almost starving to death in the camps, he eventually moved to the United States as a visiting scholar in 1985.

In 2008, the Laogai Research Foundation, a human rights NGO located in Washington, DC, estimated that approximately 1,045 laogai facilities were operating in China, and contained an estimated 500,000 to 2 million detainees.

Conditions in Laogai camps

Clothing

Unlike Laojiao (re-education through labor) inmates, Laogai criminals are issued clothing. Depending on the locale and its economic situation, the quality of clothing can vary significantly. Some prisoners may receive black or grey while others wear dark red or blue. Also depending on location, the clothing is available in different thicknesses. Commonly stamped on the uniforms are the Chinese characters for fan and lao gai meaning "criminal" and "reform through labor," respectively. Also issued to the prisoners are a pair of shoes made of rubber or plastic. These minimums do not meet the needs of the prisoners, who must purchase underclothes, socks, hats, and jackets with their monthly earnings of 2.5–3 yuan (US$0.37–US$0.44 as of April 11, 2009). Jackets were rare in the Mao era and were commonly made from patches of old blankets rather than from original cloth. Washing clothes was also rare, but clothing supplies in prisons have improved since the mid-Deng-Jiang Era.

Food
Food distribution has varied much through time, similar to its variation across the "over 1,155 documented laogai" camps. One camp near Beijing distributes between 13.5 and 22.5 kg of food per person per month. This is about average. The food consists of sorghum and corn, which are ground into flour and made into bread or gruel. The prisoners of the Beijing camp also receive 3 ounces of cooking oil per month. Every 2 weeks, the prisoners receive "a special meal of pork broth soup and white-flour steamed buns". Important Chinese holidays, such as New Year's, National Day, and the Spring Festival, are celebrated with meat dumplings, an exception in an otherwise meatless diet.

Food is distributed by one person per squad, which consists of about 10 people. This prisoner, called the zhiban or "duty prisoner," delivers the food to the rest of his group in large bowls on a cart. This often involves pushing the cart a great distance to the place where the others are working. Each day prisoners receive gruel, bread, and a watery vegetable soup made from the cheapest vegetables available. Some camps have reported two meals a day, while others allow three. Food is rationed according to rank and productive output, which is believed to provide motivation to work.

During the Mao era, food in prisons was very scarce, not only because of a nationwide famine during the Great Leap Forward (1959–1962), but also because of the harsher rules. Since little food was available, prisoners would scavenge anything they came across while working. Cases were documented of prisoners eating "field mice, crickets, locusts, toads, grapevine worms, grasshoppers, insect larvae and eggs, and venomous snakes". Also, many inmates would steal produce from the fields they worked on, smuggling vegetables back to their barracks. In Jiabiangou, Gansu, around 2,500 out of 3,000 prisoners died of starvation between 1960 and 1962, with some survivors resorting to cannibalism.

Nutrition in the camps was a big problem, especially during the early 1950s through the 1960s, in the early years of the PRC (People's Republic of China). Before the CCP (Chinese Communist Party) took control, hunger was rarely used to control prisoners. Early leaders of the CCP realized the power of withholding food from rebellious prisoners and, until recently, this practice was very common. Since the early 1990s, some camps in the coastal regions of Eastern China have improved the quality and amount of food.

Living quarters and sanitation
The living quarters, commonly referred to as barracks in most Laogai literature, were relatively primitive. Most had floors made of cement or wood, but some were of only straw and/or earth. The latrine was a bucket, and no furniture was provided. The prisoners slept on the floor in a space 30 cm wide, with 10 people per room. New prisoners were forced to sleep nearest to the latrine while more senior ones slept near the opposite wall.

Baths and showers were very rare and often not mentioned at all in memoirs. The only form of washing was the use of a water basin, which was only slightly less rare. This was ineffective because the entire squad used the same water. Basic essentials, such as a toothbrush and toothpaste, toilet paper, soap, and towels were not provided; prisoners had to spend their wages to acquire them. Prisoners were known to have spread manure, both human and animal, and been required to eat immediately without being able to wash their hands.

The sleeping quarters were surrounded on all sides by a wall. This wall is about 20 feet high and topped with electrical fencing. There were also sentry towers on each corner. Outside this wall was 40 feet of empty space, followed by another wall, similar to the first but larger.

Disease and pests
The Laogai camps were infested with many types of pests. Bed bugs were so numerous that at night they often moved in swarms. This behavior earned them the Laogai nickname of tanks or "tanke". They sucked the blood of the prisoners, leaving little red welts all over their bodies. These welts itched, and severe cases led to inmates scratching their skin raw, leading to dangerous infections. Another common pest was lice; some prisoners were known to eat them to supplement their meager diet. No insecticide or pesticides were used in the camps. The prisoner Zhang Xianliang wrote that "the parasites on a single inmate's underpants would be as numerous as the words on the front page of a newspaper". He noted fleas would be so numerous that they would "turn his quilt purplish black with their droppings". Roundworms were also a common threat to the prisoners' health, especially in laogai farms, where human excrement was used as fertilizer.

Along with a poor diet came many diet-related diseases: beriberi, edema, scurvy, and pellagra were the most common, due to lack of vitamins. Other health problems caused by the lack of healthy food included severe diarrhea or constipation from the lack of oil and fiber. These two were often left untreated and, added to the continuous strain of 12 hours of manual labor, weakened the immune system. Eventually, death followed many of these conditions. Two diseases rampant among the populations of these camps were tuberculosis and hepatitis. Highly contagious, these were also often left untreated until it was too late. Each morning, the cadre of the camp decided who was sick enough to stay in the barracks and miss the day of work. Many prisoners were forced to work when they were ill. Mental illness used to be very common during the Mao era, when prisoners had to spend 2 hours each evening being indoctrinated. The brainwashing that occurred over the amount of time people were imprisoned could be so intense that they were driven to insanity and, in many cases, suicide.

"Reform through labor"
Forced labor defines Laogai prison camps, according to Harry Wu, who has characterized the system as:

Prisoners are roused from bed at 5:30 a.m., and at 6:00 a.m. the zhiban from the kitchen wheels in a cart with tubs of corn gruel and cornbread ... at 7:00 a.m. the company public security cadre (captain) comes in, gathers all the prisoners together, and authorizes any sick prisoners to remain in the barracks. Once at the worksite, the captain delegates production responsibilities ...
At lunchtime the zhiban arrives pulling a handcart with a large tub of vegetable soup, two hunks of cornbread for each prisoner, and a large tube of drinking water ... after about 30 minutes, work is resumed until the company chief announces quitting time in the evening. Generally the prisoners return to the barracks at about 6:30 p.m.
Upon return it is once again a dinner of cornbread, corn gruel, and vegetable soup.
At 7:30 p.m., the 2-hour study period begins...
At 9:30 p.m., no matter what the weather, all prisoners gather together outside the barracks for roll call and a speech from the captain. At around 10:00 p.m., everyone goes to bed.
During the night no lights are allowed and no one is allowed to move about. One must remain in one's assigned sleeping place and wait until 5:30 a.m. the next morning before getting up, when the whole cycle begins again.

Quota filling was a big part of the inmates' lives in Laogai camps. Undershooting or overshooting the target productivity governs their quality of life. Not making the number may result in solitary confinement or loss of food privileges. Generally, food rations are cut by 10–20% if a worker fails to meet the standard. Some prisoners excel and are able to do more than what is required of them. They sometimes receive extra or better quality food. It has been argued that this extra food is not worth the extra calories burned to be more productive, so many prisoners choose to do the minimum with minimum effort, thereby saving as much energy as possible.

Working conditions in Laogai camps are substandard.
Investigators from the Laogai Research Foundation have confirmed sites where prisoners mine asbestos and other toxic chemicals with no protective gear, work with batteries and battery acid with no protection for their hands, tan hides while standing naked in vats filled 3-feet deep with chemicals used for the softening of animal skins, and work in improperly run mining facilities where explosions and other accidents are a common occurrence.

Career preparation has historically been used to justify forced labor prison systems around the world. In China, although this argument was used, career preparation was minimal until recently. Following release, the skills acquired within the Laogai prison (i.e. ditch-digging or manure-spreading) do not often lead to desirable employment. Inmates who entered the Laogai system with marketable skills were often assigned jobs utilizing these skills within the prison complex. Doctors, for example, were doctors within the Laogai camp often receiving preferential treatment, larger amounts of food, similar to the cadre, and a bed. "Inmates rarely leave with any new skills unless the training fits the camp's enterprising needs." More recently however, programs have been introduced to train prisoners in useful trades.

While there are many types of Laogai complexes, most enterprises are farms, mines, or factories. There are, according to the Chinese government, "approximately 200 different kinds of Laogai products that are exported to international markets". "A quarter of China's tea is produced in Laogai camps; 60 percent of China's rubber-vulcanizing chemicals are produced in a single Laogai camp in Shengyang ... one of the largest steel-pipe factories in the country is a Laogai camp ... " One camp alone, Ziangride, harvests more than 22,000 metric tons of grain every year. Dulan County prisoners have planted over 400,000 trees.

The conditions in these camps are considered extremely harsh by most of the world's cultures. However, the Chinese government considers Laogai to be effective in controlling prisoners and furthering China's economy. According to Mao Zedong, "The Laogai facilities are one of the violent component parts of the state machine. Laogai facilities of all levels are established as tools representing the interests of the proletariat and the people's masses and exercising dictatorship over a minority of hostile elements originating from exploiter classes."

Number of deaths
Political scientist Rudolph Rummel puts the number of forced labor "democides" at 15,720,000, excluding "all those collectivized, ill-fed and clothed peasants who would be worked to death in the fields". Human rights activist Harry Wu puts the death toll at 15 million.

In Mao: The Unknown Story, Mao Zedong's biographer Jung Chang and historian Jon Halliday estimate that perhaps 25 million people died in prisons and labor camps during Mao's rule. They say that inmates were subjected to back-breaking labor in the most hostile wastelands, and that executions and suicides by any means (like diving into a wheat chopper) were commonplace.

Further information
In 2003, the word "laogai" entered the Oxford English Dictionary.  It entered the German Duden in 2005, and French and Italian dictionaries in 2006.
In 2008, Harry Wu opened the Laogai Museum in Washington, D.C., calling it the first ever United States museum to directly address human rights in China.

In popular culture
 In the Nickelodeon animated TV series Avatar: The Last Airbender, Lake Laogai is the lake beneath which the intelligence service and secret police known as the Dai Li operates a centre for brainwashing dissidents and some of its own civilian agents.

See also

Concentration camps in the Independent State of Croatia
Devil's Island - the equivalent of the laogai in French Guiana
Extermination through labor
Forced labor in the Soviet Union
Francoist concentration camps – the equivalent of the laogai in Francoist Spain
Goli otok – the equivalent of the laogai in the Socialist Federal Republic of Yugoslavia 
Gulag – the equivalent of the laogai in the Soviet Union
Harry Wu
Human rights in China
Internment
Internment camps in Sweden during World War II
Internment of German Americans
Internment of Italian Americans
Internment of Japanese Americans
Internment of Japanese Canadians
Jean Pasqualini
Katorga – the equivalent of the laogai in the Russian Empire
Kwalliso – the equivalent of the laogai in North Korea 
Laogai Museum
Laogai Research Foundation
List of concentration and internment camps#People's Republic of China
Military Units to Aid Production – the equivalent of the laogai in Cuba
Nazi concentration camps – the equivalent of the laogai in Nazi Germany, later turned into an extermination program
Orientations for the Chinese Clergy
Penal colony
Penal labor in the United States - the equivalent of the laogai in the United States
Penal system in China
Pitestti Prison – the equivalent of the laogai in the Socialist Republic of Romania 
Prisons in North Korea
Beijing Municipal Prison
Punishment in Laos
Qincheng Prison – a maximum-security prison which is located in the Changping District, Beijing 
Re-education camp (Vietnam) – the equivalent of the laogai in Vietnam
Second Boer War concentration camps
Spaç Prison – the equivalent of the laogai in the People's Socialist Republic of Albania
Xinjiang internment camps – the equivalent of the laogai in Xinjiang, China
List of Italian concentration camps – the equivalent of the laogai in Fascist Italy

References

External links
 Human Rights Brief essay on laogai
 The True LAOGAI Foundation Europe i. Gr. laogai.org
 Mission Laogai – A project to increase student awareness of political injustice and elicit a sense of activism about injustices that occur in Laogai prisons.
 "Slavery: A 21st Century Evil" Al Jazeera English March 25, 2012
 "Al Jazeera English to close China bureau" Al Jazeera English May 8, 2012

Penal labor in China
Maoist China
History of the People's Republic of China
Xinjiang